Paduka Sri Rana Wikrama ('Ranavikrama') was the eldest son of Sri Wikrama Wira with his wife Nila Panjadi, and the third Raja of Singapura. He was known as Raja Muda  his accession and married to a daughter of Bendahara Tun Perpatih Muka Berjajar. His reign was from 1362 to 1375.

Despite the failure in the previous campaign against Singapura under the rule of his father, the Javanese chronicle Nagarakretagama list Singapura as a subject of Majapahit in 1365. During his reign, Rana Wira Kerma established a diplomatic ties with a Sumatran Muslim kingdom, Peureulak. It was during this time also, a legendary man with an unusual strength, Badang, was said to have demonstrated his feat of strength in Rana Wikrama's court.

References

Rajas of Singapore
14th-century monarchs in Asia
Hindu monarchs
Malaysian Hindus
History of Malaysia
History of Singapore
1375 deaths